Croatia participated in the Eurovision Song Contest 2010 with the song "Lako je sve" written by Branimir Mihaljević, Pamela Ramljak and Neda Parmać. The song was performed by the group Feminnem, which had previously represented Bosnia and Herzegovina in the Eurovision Song Contest in 2005 where they placed fourteenth with the song "Call Me". The Croatian broadcaster Croatian Radiotelevision (HRT) organised the national final Dora 2010 to select the Croatian entry for the 2010 contest in Oslo, Norway. A total of twenty-four entries competed in the national final which consisted of two shows: a semi-final and a final. In the semi-final on 5 March 2010, eight entries qualified to compete in the final on 6 March 2010 alongside eight pre-qualified songs. In the final, "Lako je sve" performed by Feminnem was selected as the winner following the combination of votes from a nine-member jury panel and a public televote. 

Croatia was drawn to compete in the second semi-final of the Eurovision Song Contest which took place on 27 May 2010. Performing during the show in position 15, "Lako je sve" was not announced among the top 10 entries of the second semi-final and therefore did not qualify to compete in the final. It was later revealed that Croatia placed thirteenth out of the 17 participating countries in the semi-final with 33 points.

Background 

The nation's best result in the contest was fourth, which it achieved on two occasions: in 1996 with the song "Sveta ljubav" performed by Maja Blagdan and in 1999 with the song "Marija Magdalena" performed by Doris Dragović. In 2009, Croatia managed to qualify to the final with Igor Cukrov featuring Andrea and the song "Lijepa Tena".

The Croatian national broadcaster, Croatian Radiotelevision (HRT), broadcasts the event within Croatia and organises the selection process for the nation's entry. HRT confirmed Croatia's participation in the 2010 Eurovision Song Contest on 27 October 2009. Since 1993, HRT organised the national final Dora in order to select the Croatian entry for the Eurovision Song Contest, a method that was continued for their 2010 participation.

Before Eurovision

Dora 2010 
Dora 2010 was the eighteenth edition of the Croatian national selection Dora which selected Croatia's entry for the Eurovision Song Contest 2010. The competition consisted of a semi-final and a final on 5 and 6 March 2010, both taking place at the Hotel Kvarner in Opatija and hosted by Nevena Rendeli, Mila Horvat, Mirko Fodor and Duško Ćurlić with Ida Prester and Iva Šulentić hosting segments from the green room. The semi-final was broadcast on HRT 2, while the final was broadcast on HRT 1. Both shows were also broadcast via radio on HR 2 and online via the broadcaster's website hrt.hr, while the final was also streamed online via the official Eurovision Song Contest website eurovision.tv.

Format 
A total of twenty-four songs competed in Dora 2010 which consisted of two shows: a semi-final and a final. Sixteen of the songs were selected from open submissions and competed in the semi-final with public televoting selecting the top eight to proceed to the final. In the final, the eight qualifying songs in the semi-final alongside an additional eight pre-qualified songs competed and the winner was selected by votes from the public and a jury panel. Ties in the final were decided in favour of the entry that received the most points from the jury.

Competing entries 
On 26 November 2009, HRT opened a submission period where artists and composers were able to submit their entries to the broadcaster with the deadline on 15 December 2009. 200 entries were received by the broadcaster during the submission period. A nine-member expert committee consisting of Elizabeth Homsi (HTV), Željen Klašterka (HTV), Aleksandar Kostadinov (HTV), Silvije Glojnarić (HRT), Robert Urlić (HR), Đurđica Ivanković (HR), Želimir Babogredac (HDS), Mišo Doležal (HDS) and Zvonimir Bučević (HGU) reviewed the received submissions and selected sixteen artists and songs for the semi-final of the competition, while the eight pre-qualifying songs for the final were written by composers invited by HRT in consultation with the Croatian Composers' Society (HDS). The composers also selected the performer for their entry. The invited composers were announced on 16 December 2009 and were:

Alfi Kabiljo
Ante Pecotić
Boris Đurđević
Denis Dumančić
Luka Zima
Miro Buljan
Miroslav Škoro
Neno Ninčević

HRT announced the entries competing in the semi-final on 29 December 2009 and among the artists was Feminnem which represented Bosnia and Herzegovina in the Eurovision Song Contest 2005. The pre-qualified entries competing in the final were announced on 8 January 2010. On 11 and 12 February 2010, the competing artists performed their entries live during the preview show Ususret dori broadcast on HRT 2.

Shows

Semi-final
The semi-final took place on 5 March 2010. The eight qualifiers for the final were determined exclusively by a public televote. In addition to the performances of the competing entries, Putokazi performed as the interval act during the show.

Final
The final took place on 6 March 2010. The eight entries that qualified from the semi-final alongside the eight pre-qualified entries competed and the winner, "Lako je sve" performed by Feminnem, was determined by a 50/50 combination of votes from a nine-member jury panel and a public televote. Feminnem won the televote with 3,578 of the total votes. The jury that voted in the final consisted of Elizabeth Homsi (HTV), Željen Klašterka (HTV), Aleksandar Kostadinov (HTV), Silvije Glojnarić (HRT), Robert Urlić (HR), Đurđica Ivanković (HR), Želimir Babogredac (HDS), Mišo Doležal (HDS) and Zvonimir Bučević (HGU). In addition to the performances of the competing entries, the show was opened by 2009 Croatian Eurovision entrant Igor Cukrov, while 1994 Croatian Eurovision entrant Tony Cetinski performed as the interval act.

Preparation
In late March, Feminnem filmed the music video for "Lako je sve", which was directed by Radislav Jovanov Gonzo with outfits designed by Gordana Zucić. The music video was presented on 20 March following the HRT news programme Dnevnik. Russian, Italian and English versions of the song were also recorded entitled "Ljehko vsjo", "Semplice" and "Easy to See", respectively.

Promotion 
Feminnem specifically promoted "Lako je sve" as the Croatian Eurovision entry on 14 March 2010 by performing during the presentation show of the 2010 Bosnian Eurovision entry, BH Eurosong Show 2010.

At Eurovision

According to Eurovision rules, all nations with the exceptions of the host country and the "Big Four" (France, Germany, Spain and the United Kingdom) were required to qualify from one of two semi-finals in order to compete for the final; the top ten countries from each semi-final progress to the final. The European Broadcasting Union (EBU) split up the competing countries into six different pots based on voting patterns from previous contests, with countries with favourable voting histories put into the same pot. On 7 February 2010, a special allocation draw was held which placed each country into one of the two semi-finals, as well as which half of the show they would perform in. Croatia was placed into the second semi-final, to be held on 27 May 2010, and was scheduled to perform in the second half of the show. The running order for the semi-finals was decided through another draw on 23 March 2010 and Croatia was set to perform in position 15, following the entry from Cyprus and before the entry from Georgia.

The two semi-finals and the final were broadcast in Croatia on HRT with commentary by Duško Ćurlić. The Croatian spokesperson, who announced the Croatian votes during the final, was Mila Horvat.

Semi-final 

Feminnem took part in technical rehearsals on 19 and 23 May, followed by dress rehearsals on 26 and 27 May. This included the jury show on 26 May where the professional juries of each country watched and voted on the competing entries.

The Croatian performance featured the members of Feminnem in cream-coloured dresses, joined on stage by two dancers dressed in black catsuits. The group began the performance on a bench in the back of the stage before moving to the front to do a dance routine. At the end of the performance, a huge red heart-shaped prop was displayed at the front of the stage with the members of Feminnem in the centre of it while the dancers threw flowers over them. The stage lighting was predominantly dark with blue and red elements, while blue drapes and a wind machine were also used. The two dancers that joined Feminnem were Irma and Lydia Iveković.

At the end of the show, Croatia was not announced among the top 10 entries in the second semi-final and therefore failed to qualify to compete in the final. It was later revealed that Croatia placed thirteenth in the semi-final, receiving a total of 33 points.

Voting 
Voting during the three shows consisted of 50 percent public televoting and 50 percent from a jury deliberation. The jury consisted of five music industry professionals who were citizens of the country they represent. This jury was asked to judge each contestant based on: vocal capacity; the stage performance; the song's composition and originality; and the overall impression by the act. In addition, no member of a national jury could be related in any way to any of the competing acts in such a way that they cannot vote impartially and independently.

Following the release of the full split voting by the EBU after the conclusion of the competition, it was revealed that the Croatia had placed fourteenth with the public televote and twelfth with the jury vote in the second semi-final. In the public vote, Croatia scored 22 points, while with the jury vote, Croatia scored 54 points.

Below is a breakdown of points awarded to Croatia and awarded by Croatia in the second semi-final and grand final of the contest. The nation awarded its 12 points to Cyprus in the semi-final and to Turkey in the final of the contest.

Points awarded to Croatia

Points awarded by Croatia

References

External links
  Official Dora website HRT
  Dora 2010 - 16 semi-finalists and reserves HRT
  Dora 2010 - 8 finalists HRT

2010
Countries in the Eurovision Song Contest 2010
Eurovision